Dr. Seuss: How the Grinch Stole Christmas! is a video game by American developer Black Lantern Studios based on the 1957 Dr. Seuss book of the same name, but mostly based on the 2000 film. The game was released on November 8, 2007.

Reception

Dr. Seuss: How The Grinch Stole Christmas! has received mixed reviews. GameRankings gave it a score of 54% and Metacritic gave it 55 out of 100.

References

2007 video games
Nintendo DS games
Nintendo DS-only games
How The Grinch Stole Christmas! video games
Video games based on adaptations
Video games based on films
Destination Software games
Video games developed in the United States
Black Lantern Studios games
Single-player video games